Pectinivalva trepida is a moth of the family Nepticulidae. It is found along the south-eastern coast of Victoria.

The wingspan is 4.4–4.8 mm for males.

The host plant is unknown, but probably a Myrtaceae species. They probably mine the leaves of their host plant.

External links
Australian Faunal Directory
Australian Nepticulidae (Lepidoptera): Redescription of the named species

Moths of Australia
Nepticulidae
Moths described in 1906
Taxa named by Edward Meyrick